2,4,6-Trihydroxyacetophenone (THAP) is a chemical compound that is a derivative of phloroglucinol.

In an animal model, THAP was reported to enhance cholesterol 7 alpha-hydroxylase (CYP7A1) activity.

THAP is also used as a matrix in matrix-assisted laser desorption/ionization (MALDI) for the analysis of acidic glycans and glycopeptides in negative ion mode.

Derivatives
THAP is a chemical precursor that can be used to form part of the backbone of 5,7-dihydroxyflavones like noreugenin, apigenin, luteolin, diosmetin, naringenin, and hesperetin.

See also
Flopropione

References

Phloroglucinols
Aromatic ketones
3-Hydroxypropenals